is a Japanese politician of the Democratic Party of Japan and a member of the House of Councillors in the Diet (national legislature). He represents the Aichi at-large district. A native of Toyohashi, Aichi and a graduate of Hitotsubashi University and the George Washington University School of Public Policy and Public Administration, he ran unsuccessfully for the House of Representatives in 1996. In 1998 he ran for the House of Councillors and was elected for the first time.

References

External links 
  in Japanese.

Members of the House of Councillors (Japan)
Living people
1965 births
Hitotsubashi University alumni
Trachtenberg School of Public Policy & Public Administration alumni
Democratic Party of Japan politicians